The Permic or Permian languages are a branch of the Uralic language family. They are spoken in several regions to the west of the Ural Mountains within the Russian Federation. The total number of speakers is around 950,000, of which around 550,000 speak the most widely spoken language, Udmurt. Like other Uralic languages, the Permic languages are primarily agglutinative and have a rich system of grammatical cases. Unlike many others, they do not have vowel harmony.

The earliest Permic language to be preserved in writing was Old Permic or Old Zyryan, in the 14th century.

The extant Permic languages division of the Finno-Ugric branch of the Uralic language family consists of the:

 Udmurt (Votyak)
 Komi (Zyryan)
 Permyak (Komi-Permyak)

The Permic languages have traditionally been classified as Finno-Permic languages, along with the Finnic, Saami, Mordvin, and Mari languages. The Finno-Permic and Ugric languages together made up the Finno-Ugric family. However, this taxonomy has more recently been called into question, and the relationship of the Permic languages to other Uralic languages remains uncertain.

Phonology
Proto-Uralic word roots have been subject to particularly heavy reduction in the Permic languages.
 Original geminates *pp, *tt, *kk were reduced to single voiceless stops *p, *t, *k.
 Between vowels, original single *p, *t, *k as well as *w and *x were lost entirely.
 Second-syllable vowels were lost almost entirely. Certain words in Udmurt may preserve traces (PU *lumi "snow" → Udm лымы /lɨmɨ/).
 The sibilants *s, *ś, *š have remained distinct from each other in all positions, but were voiced to *z, *ź, *ž  between voiced sounds.
 Consonant clusters were largely simplified: in particular nasal + stop/affricate clusters yield voiced stops/affricates, and stop + sibilant clusters yield voiceless sibilants.

A peculiarity of Permic is the occurrence of the voiced consonants such as *b, *g word-initially even in inherited vocabulary, apparently a development from original PU voiceless consonants.

The Proto-Permic consonant inventory is reconstructed as:

This inventory is retained nearly unchanged in the modern-day Permic languages.

In later Russian loanwords, the consonants  can occur.

The consonant  was marginal and occurred only word-initially or after a word-initial , generally traceable to diphthongization of the close back vowel of the 2nd series. An exceptional word is the numeral "six", which in Komi is the only native word root with an initial cluster.

Literary Komi and literary Udmurt both possess a seven-vowel system . These are however not related straightforwardly, and numerous additional vowels are required for Proto-Permic, perhaps as many as 15 altogether. The reconstruction of Proto-Permic vocalism and its development from Proto-Uralic has always been a puzzling topic, for which there are several models. There is general agreement on the existence of two series of close vowels, one of which results in modern  in literary Udmurt and literary Komi-Zyryan, the other in correspondences of Udmurt  to Komi  (but long  in the Komi-Yodzyak language). Proposed distinguishing factors for these include length, tenseness and height.

Morphophonology
Noun roots in the Permic languages are predominantly monosyllabic and invariable with the canonical shape (C)VC. CV roots, such as Udmurt ву /vu/, Komi and Permyak ва /va/ 'water', and (C)VCC roots, such as Udmurt урт /urt/, Komi орт /ort/ 'soul', exist as well. In Udmurt, there are furthermore a number of bisyllabic roots, mostly of the shape (C)VCɨ.

In noun roots with certain final clusters, the second consonant surfaces only when followed with a vowel in inflected or derived forms :

Udmurt has similar alternation for a number of other clusters of the shape voiced consonant+/m/, while Komi-Zyryan adds a number of clusters of the shape voiced consonant+/j/.

The verb root for 'to come': Udmurt лыкты- /lɨktɨ-/, Komi локты- /loktɨ-/ also shows alternation to plain /k/ in e.g. the imperative (in Udmurt only dialectally).

Notes

Bibliography

Further reading
 Ante, Aikio. "Studies in Uralic Etymology V: Permic Etymologies". In: Linguistica Uralica LVII, nr. 3 (2021): 161–179. DOI: https://dx.doi.org/10.3176/lu.2021.3.01
 Fedjunjova, Galina. "Etnitsheskije kontakty i divergentsija permskich jazykov" [Ethnic Contacts and the Divergence of the Permic Languages]. In: Linguistica Uralica 50, nr. 2 (2014). pp. 109-121. DOI: 10.3176/lu.2014.2.03

External links
 S. K. Belykh. Swadesh list for Permic languages
 Permic languages

 
Languages of Russia